Jamaterek (from Mandarin Chinese Jiamatiereke ) is a township of Akto County in Xinjiang Uygur Autonomous Region, China. Located in the northeastern part of the county, the township covers an area of 44 square kilometers with a population of 11,398 (as of 2017). It has 7 administrative villages under its jurisdiction. Its seat is at Bagla Village .

Name

The name of Jamal terek or Jamalterak is from Uyghur language, Jamal is a personal name, and terek means "poplar tree". It is said that 250 years ago (about 1770s), there was a tall poplar tree in Tairegeilikehuoyila, near which lived a capable woman named Jamal Han, so the land was named after it.

History
In 1955, Jamalterak was transferred to Akto County from Yengisar.

In 1962, a commune was founded.

In 1967, the commune was renamed Shuguang Commune.

In 1984, the commune was renamed and made into a township.

Geography
Jamaterek Township is located between the east longitude 76°36′ to 76°41′, and the north latitude 39°04′ to 39°29′. The township is to the northeast of the Akto County seat.

Climate 
The township's climate is mild, and precipitation is scarce.

Administrative divisions
The township has the following seven administrative villages under its jurisdiction:
 Bagla Village (Bagela, Bagelacun) 
 Kashboy Village ( / Kashiboyi)
 Konahoyla Village (Kuonahuoyila; /)
 Koshterek Village (Kuoshitiereke)
 Sakkizerik Village (Saikezi'airike)
 Turtay Village (Tuo'ertayi)
 Wukamaili Village

Demographics

, the population of Barin Township was 99.7% Uyghur.

Economy
Livestock raised in Jamaterek include cattle, donkeys, and sheep. The township's economic is agriculture-oriented, with key sectors including animal husbandry, the fruit industry, and the planting of wheat, corn, cotton and other crops.

Education 
The township is home to one middle school, three primary schools, and four kindergartens.

References 

Township-level divisions of Akto County